Kinghorn Methodist Episcopal Cemetery is located in the Kinghorn community of King, Ontario. The cemetery sits on a hill 300 metres south of King road, on the east side of Jane street. It was established in 1848. Of the 30 headstones that are visible on the site only 24 are still standing.  Many have cracked and fallen over with age, and have later been restored and reinforced.

References

 Jennifer McKendry (2003). Into the Silent Land: Historic Cemeteries & Graveyards in Ontario, Kingston, Ont. 

Cemeteries in Ontario
King, Ontario
History of Methodism
Methodist cemeteries
Designated heritage properties in Ontario